Arístides Pérez (born 31 August 1933) is a Guatemalan wrestler. He competed in two events at the 1952 Summer Olympics.

References

1933 births
Living people
Guatemalan male sport wrestlers
Olympic wrestlers of Guatemala
Wrestlers at the 1952 Summer Olympics
Place of birth missing (living people)